The Northcutt-Carter Route is a popular technical climbing route on Hallett Peak in Colorado's Rocky Mountain National Park.  The Northcutt-Carter Route is recognized in the historic climbing text Fifty Classic Climbs of North America.

A massive rockfall in 1999 removed the first two pitches of the route.

References

External links 
mountainproject.com

Climbing routes
Rocky Mountain National Park
Tourist attractions in Colorado